Takumi Oshima (Japanese大嶋 匠; born 2 February 1990) is a Japanese professional baseball player who currently plays for the Hokkaido Nippon-Ham Fighters of Nippon Professional Baseball. He made his debut in 2014, which turned out to be his only game of the season. In his one at-bat, he struck out.

References

1990 births
Living people
Japanese baseball players
Nippon Professional Baseball catchers
Hokkaido Nippon-Ham Fighters players